This is a list of famous Transylvanian Saxons.

Academics
 Adele Zay, (1848–1928), pedagogue and teacher training administrator who spread Fröbel's theories on Kindergartens.

Artists 

 Wilhelm Georg Berger, composer
 Friedrich von Bömches, painter
 Hans Fronius, painter and illustrator
 Steve Holmes, adult film actor
 Peter Maffay, singer
 Edith Soterius von Sachsenheim, painter
 Hymie Shertzer, musician big band era
 Helge Parsch/Maiterth, designer
 Michael Roth, artist (Canada)

Noble families 

 House of Soterius von Sachsenheim
 Fronius family
 Medard de Nympz family (of the knight Medardus de Nympz of Niemesch/Nemșa in Moșna, Sibiu County)
 Póka von Pókafalva

Politicians 

 Samuel von Brukenthal, former Habsburg governor of Transylvania
 Stephan Ludwig Roth, intellectual, Evangelic Lutheran pastor, revolutionary
 Michael Weiß, former mayor of Mediaș/Mediasch
 Johannes Benkner, former mayor of Brașov/Kronstadt
 Christian Tell, former mayor of Bucharest
 Michael Trein, former mayor of Prejmer
 Daniel Thellman, former mayor of Mediaș
 Klaus Johannis, current president of Romania and former mayor of Sibiu/Hermannstadt between 2000 and 2014
 Astrid Fodor, current mayor of Sibiu/Hermannstadt (since 2014 onwards)
 Iancu Sasul, former Prince of Moldavia during the late 16th century

Scientists 
 Conrad Haas, military engineer, pioneer of rocket propulsion
 Hermann Oberth, space flight technology pioneer
 Hannah Monyer, physician and researcher
 Ignaz Edler von Born, Mineralogist/Metallurgist

Sportsmen 
 Michael Klein, professional soccer player
 Martin Fabi, football player - CFL
 Randy Fabi, football player - CFL

Writers 
 Johannes Honter, theologian
 Christian Schesaeus, poet, humanist, and Evangelical Lutheran pastor
 Johann Sommer, theologian
 Joseph Haltrich, author of fairytales/stories for children from the Transylvanian Saxon folklore
 Dutz Schuster, writer and poet
 Oskar Pastior, poet
Dr. Misch Orend, author, "Kruge und Teller", and other works about Transylvania 

Transylvanian Saxons
German